Crown (from the ) is an area situated beside the city centre of Inverness, the capital city of the Scottish Highlands. In general, the area's housing dates back to the Victorian or Edwardian era.

References

Areas of Inverness